Harnett County Schools is a PK–12 graded school district serving Harnett County, North Carolina. Its 28 schools serve 20,615 students as of the 2015–16 school year.

High school students living in the Linden Oaks housing development, of Fort Bragg, are assigned to Harnett County Schools' Overhills High School.

History
A push for school consolidation began in the 1920s. By 1933, more modern high schools and community schools were developed. Another push for consolidation occurred in the 1970s after desegregation.

The latter push for school consolidations began in 1963. However, county residents four times rejected bond referendums that would help pay for new schools. Even though the bond referendum failed in 1974, the county commissioners moved forward with their plans for the school construction, approving a tax increase to help fund it. The result was three new high schools: Western Harnett and Harnett Central in 1978, as well as Triton in 1986.

Student demographics
For the 2014–15 school year, Harnett County Schools had a total population of 20,506 students and 1,260.96 teachers on a (FTE) basis. This produced a student-teacher ratio of 16.26:1. That same year, out of the total student population, the gender ratio was 52% male to 48% female. The demographic group makeup was: White, 53%; Black, 25%; Hispanic, 16%; American Indian, 1%; and Asian/Pacific Islander, 0% (two or more races: 4%). For the same school year, 56.12% of the students received free and reduced-cost lunches.

Governance
The primary governing body of Harnett County Schools follows a council–manager government format with a five-member Board of Education appointing a Superintendent to run the day-to-day operations of the system. The school system currently resides in the North Carolina State Board of Education's Fourth District.

Board of Education
The five members of the Board of Education are chosen in partisan elections by districts to four-year terms. They generally meet on the first Monday of each month. The current members of the board are: Jason Lemons (District III), Vivian Bennett (District I), William H. Morris (District II), Duncan E. Jaggers (Chair, District IV), and Don R Godfrey (Vice-Chair, District V). The superintendent serves as secretary of the board.

Superintendent
The current superintendent of the system is Aaron Fleming.

Schools

High Schools

Harnett Central High
Overhills High
Star Academy
Triton High
Western Harnett High

Middle Schools

Coats Erwin Middle
Dunn Middle
Harnett Central Middle
Highland Middle
Overhills Middle
Star Academy
Western Harnett Middle

Elementary/Primary Schools

Anderson Creek Primary
Angier Elementary
Benhaven Elementary
Boone Trail Elementary
Buies Creek Elementary
Coats Elementary
Dunn Elementary
Erwin Elementary
Highland Elementary
Johnsonville Elementary
LaFayette Elementary
Lillington-Shawtown Elementary
North Harnett Primary
Overhills Elementary
South Harnett Elementary

References

External links
 

Education in Harnett County, North Carolina
School districts in North Carolina